Oktyabrevka is a rural locality (a village) in Allaguvatsky Selsoviet, Sterlibashevsky District, Bashkortostan, Russia. The population was 20 as of 2010. There is 1 street.

Geography 
Oktyabrevka is located 28 km southeast of Sterlibashevo (the district's administrative centre) by road. Karayar is the nearest rural locality.

References 

Rural localities in Sterlibashevsky District